Mohammad Ziauddin is a Bangladeshi diplomat and the former Ambassador of Bangladesh to the United States.

Early life and education 
Ziauddin graduated from St Gregory's High School. He completed his Intermediate of Humanities from Notre Dame College, Dhaka; BA Honors and MA in English literature from the University of Dhaka.

Career 
Ziauddin served in the Bangladesh High Commission in London; Bangladesh High Commission in Nairobi, Kenya; and Permanent Mission of Bangladesh to the United Nations. He has served as the Bangladesh Ambassador to Italy, Director General (International Organizations) in the Ministry of Foreign Affairs, and Chief of Protocol to the Government of Bangladesh.

He served as the Ambassador-at-Large of Prime Minister Sheikh Hasina from 24 November 2009 to 2014. He was afterwards appointed as the Bangladesh Ambassador to the United States on 18 September 2014. In 2016 he was appointed as the first Ambassador (non-resident) to Guyana. He was also made the first (non-resident) ambassador to Belize. On 7 May 2021, he was again appointed Ambassador-at-Large of Prime Minister Sheikh Hasina with the rank of a Cabinet Minister.

Personal life 
Ziauddin is married to Yasmeen Ziauddin, and has two children.

References 

1957 births
Living people
Ambassadors of Bangladesh to Italy
Ambassadors of Bangladesh to the United States
Bangladeshi diplomats
Notre Dame College, Dhaka alumni
Ambassadors of Bangladesh to Argentina